The soft-plumaged petrel (Pterodroma mollis) is a species of seabird in the family Procellariidae.

Distribution
It breeds on islands in the Southern Hemisphere, nesting on Tristan da Cunha, Gough Island, the Prince Edward Islands, Crozet Islands, Macquarie Island, and on the Antipodes Islands of New Zealand.  Small numbers breed in the Maatsuyker Island Group of southern Tasmania.  It disperses outside the breeding season, reaching eastern South America north to Brazil, southern Africa and Australia. It has occurred as a vagrant in Israel, Norway and Jordan.

Taxonomy
Fea's petrel (P. feae), Desertas petrel (P. desertae) and Zino's petrel (P. madeira) of the North Atlantic were formerly treated as subspecies of this bird.

Description
The soft-plumaged petrel is a medium-sized petrel. Its plumage is dark grey and white, and its wings are narrow and with a pointed tail distinct in flight. It has a dark grey head with prominent white feathers on the cheeks and throat. There is a white speckling on forehead along with a prominent dark eye patch. Its underside is mostly white, which turned dark grey at underwings. The bill is black and about 25–32 mm long and has a sharp hook. Its legs are pink with black on the outer webs and toes.

Both sexes are noisy, making medium-pitched moans and shrill squeaks.

Gallery

References

External links 

 Soft-plumaged petrel photos

Birds of Saint Helena Island
Birds of subantarctic islands
Birds of the Atlantic Ocean
Birds of the Indian Ocean
Birds of the Pacific Ocean
Fauna of the Crozet Islands
Fauna of the Prince Edward Islands
soft-plumaged petrel
soft-plumaged petrel
Taxa named by John Gould
Taxonomy articles created by Polbot